Chelsea Walls is a 2001 independent film directed by Ethan Hawke and released by Lions Gate Entertainment. It is based on the 1990 play Chelsea Walls by Nicole Burdette. It stars Kris Kristofferson, Uma Thurman, Rosario Dawson, Natasha Richardson, Vincent D'Onofrio, and Robert Sean Leonard among others, with original score by Jeff Tweedy of Wilco. The story takes place in the historic Chelsea Hotel in New York City.

Plot
The film tells five stories of a number of artists as they spend a single day in New York's famed bohemian home Chelsea Hotel, struggling with their arts and personal lives.

Cast

 Kris Kristofferson as Bud
 Uma Thurman as Grace
 Robert Sean Leonard as Terry Olsen
 Vincent D'Onofrio as Frank
 Natasha Richardson as Mary
 Rosario Dawson as Audrey
 Mark Webber as Val
 Frank Whaley as Lynny Barnum
 Kevin Corrigan as Crutches
 Guillermo Díaz as Kid
 Bianca Hunter as Lorna Doone
 Matthew Del Negro as Rookie cop
 Paz de la Huerta as Girl
 Paul Failla as Cop
 Duane McLaughlin as Wall
 Jimmy Scott as Skinny Bones
 John Seitz as Dean
 Mark Strand as Journalist
 Heather Watts as Ballerina
 Tuesday Weld as Greta
 Harris Yulin as Bud's editor
 Steve Zahn as Ross
 Sam Connelly, Richard Linklater, and Peter Salett as Cronies

Reception
Chelsea Walls received negative reviews, currently holding a 26% rating on Rotten Tomatoes.
Roger Ebert gave the film three stars out of four, claiming:  "Movies like this do not grab you by the throat. You have to be receptive. The first time I saw "Chelsea Walls," in a stuffy room late at night at Cannes 2001, I found it slow and pointless. This time, I saw it earlier in the day, fueled by coffee, and I understood that the movie is not about what the characters do, but about what they are. It may be a waste of time to spend your life drinking, fornicating, posing as a genius and living off your friends, but if you've got the money, honey, take off the time."

References

External links
 
 
 
 

2001 films
2001 drama films
2001 independent films
American drama films
American independent films
American spy films
Camcorder films
Films about music and musicians
Films about suicide
American films based on plays
Films set in hotels
Films set in New York City
Films shot in New York City
Films scored by Jeff Tweedy
Films directed by Ethan Hawke
Films produced by Christine Vachon
Killer Films films
Lionsgate films
2001 directorial debut films
2000s English-language films
2000s American films